Aman Chang (張敏) is a Hong Kong film director.

Filmography
Raped by an Angel 2: The Uniform Fan (1998)
Raped by an Angel 3: Sexual Fantasy of the Chief Executive (1998)
Sex and Zen III (1998)
Fist Power (2000)
The Trouble-Makers (2003)
The Legend of Chu Liuxiang (2012, TV series)
Let Go for Love (2014)
Flirting in the Air (2014)
The Gigolo (2015) (as producer only)
Flirting Scholar From the Future (2019)
Enter the Fat Dragon (2020 film)

References

External links
Aman Chang at Hong Kong Cinemagic

Hong Kong film directors
Year of birth missing (living people)
Place of birth missing (living people)
Living people